Vilariño de Conso is a municipality in Ourense in the Galicia region of north-west Spain. It is one of the largest municipalities in the Ourense region and lies in the central eastern part of the province.

References

Municipalities in the Province of Ourense